The Harris-Ramsey-Norris House is a historic residence in Quitman, Georgia. It was added to the National Register of Historic Places on September 5, 2008. It was constructed in the second half of the 19th century. It is located at 1004 West Lafayette Street.

It was deemed significant "because it is an excellent and intact example of a central hallway cottage with rear ell."

See also
National Register of Historic Places listings in Brooks County, Georgia
Quitman Historic District

References

External links
 

Houses on the National Register of Historic Places in Georgia (U.S. state)
Houses in Brooks County, Georgia